Evening Mood (Humeur Nocturne) is an 1882 painting by William-Adolphe Bouguereau, now in the collection of the Havana's Museum of Fine Arts, in Cuba.

See also
William-Adolphe Bouguereau gallery

References

External links
William-Adolphe Bouguereau at the Web Museum

Paintings by William-Adolphe Bouguereau
1882 paintings
Nude art
Paintings in Cuba